Venkoba Rao (15 August 1925 – 19 June 2015) was an Indian cricketer. He played two first-class matches for Mysore between 1945 and 1948.

References

External links
 

1925 births
2015 deaths
Indian cricketers
Karnataka cricketers
Place of birth missing